Note: "Firth" is a common name for sounds in Shetland

Firth is a village in the north east of Mainland, Shetland, Scotland, in the parish of Delting, not far from Mossbank. It is 27 miles from Lerwick.

History
Along with a stone memorial at the entrance to the village, many abandoned croft houses still stand on the hill across Firth Voe from Mossbank. These commemorate the infamous "Delting Disaster" of 21 December 1900 when twenty-two local fishermen were lost during a storm, decimating the community.

Because of the oil industry, which grew in 1970s Shetland, a number of temporary dwellings were built, followed by some housing estates, some now demolished.

Footnotes

External links

Canmore - Elizabeth: Infield, Delting, North Sea site record

Villages in Mainland, Shetland
Disasters in Scotland